The Samogo languages are a small group of Mande languages of Mali and Burkina Faso.

Seenku (Seeku, Sembla, Seemogo)
Duun
Dzuun (East Duun). Dialects: Kpango (Kpan, Samoro-guan), Dzùùngoo (Samogo-iri).
Duun (West Duun, Du, Duungooma, Samogo-sien)
Banka (Bankagooma)
Jowulu (Jɔ)
Jowulu is divergent.

The name Samogo or Samogho is a Jula and Bambara term for several Mande languages which do not necessarily form a clade, including the Samo languages.

References

 
Mande languages